Suffolk College or Suffolk University may refer to:

United Kingdom
 Suffolk New College, Ipswich
 University of Suffolk, in Suffolk and Norfolk
 West Suffolk College, Bury St Edmunds

United States
 Suffolk County Community College, Selden, New York
 Suffolk University, Boston, Massachusetts
 Suffolk College of Arts and Sciences, part of Suffolk University